The 2007–08 CERH European League was the 43rd edition of the CERH European League organized by CERH. Its Final Eight was held in May 2008 at the Palau Blaugrana, in Barcelona, Spain.

Group stage
In each group, teams played against each other home-and-away in a home-and-away round-robin format.

The group winners advanced to the Final Four.

Group A

Group B

Group C

Group D

Final four
The Final Four was played at Palau Blaugrana, in Barcelona, Spain.

Barcelona achieved its 18th title.

Bracket

References

External links
 CERH website

2007 in roller hockey
2008 in roller hockey
Rink Hockey Euroleague